The Last Judgment is part of the eschatology of the Abrahamic religions and in the Frashokereti of Zoroastrianism.

Last Judgment or Last Judgement may also refer to a variety of creative works, such as, chronologically:

Art
Doom painting, a general term for frescos, usually on the west wall of a church 
 The Last Judgment, a tympanum by Gislebertus
 Crucifixion and Last Judgement diptych, Jan van Eyck
 The Last Judgment (Fra Angelico, Florence), a painting by Fra Angelico
 The Last Judgment (Rogier van der Weyden), a triptych by Rogier van der Weyden
 The Last Judgment (Memling), a 1471 triptych attributed to Hans Memling
 The Last Judgment (Bosch triptych), a triptych by Hieronymus Bosch
 The Last Judgment (Bosch triptych, Bruges), a triptych by thought  to be done by Hieronymus Bosch
 The Last Judgment (Bosch triptych fragment), a fragment of a triptych by Hieronymus Bosch
 The Last Judgment (Michelangelo), a fresco by Michelangelo in the Sistine Chapel
 Last Judgement (Lochner), a polyptych by Stefan Lochner
 The Great Last Judgement (Rubens) by Rubens
 A Vision of the Last Judgement, an 1810 painting by William Blake
 The Last Judgement (Martin painting), part of a triptych by the British artist John Martin

Film
 The Last Judgment (1945 film), a 1945 French drama film
 The Last Judgment (1961 film), an Italian-language comedy film

Music
The Last Judgement Naji Hakim
The Last Judgement Louis Spohr